St. John's Protestant Episcopal Church may refer to:

St. John's Protestant Episcopal Church (Stamford, Connecticut), listed on the National Register of Historic Places in Fairfield County, Connecticut
St. John's Protestant Episcopal Church (Baltimore, Maryland), listed on the National Register of Historic Places in Baltimore County, Maryland
St. John's Protestant Episcopal Church (Yonkers, New York), listed on the National Register of Historic Places in Westchester County, New York
 St. John's Protestant Episcopal Church (Charleston, South Carolina)